Kibuye is an area within the city of Kampala, Uganda's capital.

Location
Kibuye is bordered by Katwe to the north, Nsambya to the east, Makindye to the south, Ndeeba to the west, and Mengo to the northwest.

Overview
Kibuye is a low-income residential area, with emphasis on entertainment. Due to its proximity to the slum in Katwe and the business suburbs of Ndeeba and Makindye, Kibuye is a combination of these environments. There are numerous bars, pubs and nightclubs clustered in a fairly confined area of the city. As is the case with neighboring Katwe, Kibuye has a high crime rate.

Points of interest
The following points of interest lie in or near Kibuye:
 Kibuye Roundabout - The confluence of the Kampala–Entebbe Road, the Kampala–Masaka Road and the Kampala–Makindye Road.
 Good Samaritan Senior Secondary School - A private high school
 Kibuye central market - A fresh-produce market administered by the Buganda government
 Kibuye Primary School - A public elementary school
 The railway line from Kampala to Kasese goes through Kibuye

See also 

 Kampala-Entebbe Road

References

External links
 Know Your Hood: Kibuye, The Place Synonymous With Traffic Noises And Jams

Neighborhoods of Kampala
Makindye Division
Central Region, Uganda